Alexander (Sasha) Gusev is a computational biologist and an Assistant Professor of Medicine at Harvard Medical School.

Research and career
Alexander Gusev has developed computational methods that use genetic data to decipher disease mechanisms. For example, he has identified 34 new genes associated with increased risk of earliest-stage ovarian cancer. He has developed computational methods that integrate molecular data to facilitate functional interpretation of findings from genome-wide association studies. He has contributed to the development of the transcriptome-wide association study approach to mapping disease-associated genes. In addition, he studies the interactions between germline (host) and somatic events (tumor) - which are typically studied separately - and their effects on cancer progression and treatment response to advance precision oncology.

Awards and honors

 Claudia Adams Barr Award, 2017-2019
 Ruth L. Kirschstein National Research Service Award 2013-2015

Selected publications

 Integrative approaches for large-scale transcriptome-wide association studies. A Gusev, A Ko, H Shi, G Bhatia, W Chung, B Penninx, R Jansen, E Geus, et al. Nature Genetics. 48(3):245–252. doi:10.1038/ng.3506
 Transcriptome-wide association study of schizophrenia and chromatin activity yields mechanistic disease insights. A Gusev, N Mancuso, H Won, M Kousi, HK Finucane, Y Reshef, L Song, et al. Nature Genetics. 50(4):538-548. doi:10.1038/s41588-018-0092-1
 Quantifying genetic effects on disease mediated by assayed gene expression levels.Yao DW, O'Connor LJ, Price AL, Gusev A. Nature Genetics. 52(6):626-633. doi:10.1038/s41588-020-0625-2
 Allele-specific epigenetic activity in prostate cancer and normal prostate tissue implicates prostate cancer risk mechanisms. Shetty A, Seo JH, Bell CA, O'Connor EP, Pomerantz MM, Freedman ML, Gusev A. The American Journal of Human Genetics. 108(11):2071-2085. doi:10.1016/j.ajhg.2021.09.008
 Atlas of prostate cancer heritability in European and African-American men pinpoints tissue-specific regulation. A Gusev, H Shi, G Kichaev, M Pomerantz, F Li et al. Nature Communications. doi:10.1038/ncomms10979
 Partitioning heritability of regulatory and cell-type-specific variants across 11 common diseases. A Gusev, SH Lee, G Trynka, H Finucane et al. The American Journal of Human Genetics. 95(5):535-52. doi:10.1016/j.ajhg.2014.10.004
 Genetic ancestry contributes to somatic mutations in lung cancers from admixed Latin American populations. J Carrot-Zhang, G Soca-Chafre, N Patterson,..., A Gusev, M Meyerson. Cancer Discovery. 11(3):591-598. doi:10.1158/2159-8290.CD-20-1165

References

External links 

Geneticists
Statistical_geneticists
Columbia University alumni
Harvard Medical School people
Year of birth missing (living people)
Living people